Newbuild may refer to:

Newbuild, or Newbuilding in shipbuilding
Newbuild, a housing category eligible for Equity sharing in the UK
Newbuild (album), a 1988 album by 808 State